The  National Public Transport Gazetteer (NPTG) 
provides a topographic database of towns and settlements in the UK; it provides a common frame of reference for the National Public Transport Access Nodes (NaPTAN) schema and other UK Public Transport Information schemas such as JourneyWeb.

Gazetteers are  used for electronic Journey planners to associate  stops and destinations with named urban settlements. They are also useful for disambiguating different  places with the same name.

See also 
NaPTAN
GovTalk

References

External links 
 

Public transport in the United Kingdom